Greenpeace Magazin is a German language environmentalist and political magazine based in Hamburg, Germany. It is not affiliated with the Greenpeace organization.

History and profile
The magazine was started in 1996 with the name Greenpeace Nachrichten. It is owned by Greenpeace Media GmbH and is headquartered in Hamburg. The publisher is Greenpeace Umweltschutzverlag GmbH. It is published on a bi-monthly basis. It was formerly published quarterly. The magazine is printed on 100% recycled paper.

The magazine covers the topics of environment, politics and the economy. It also features interviews with company executives and politicians. The other topics covered include environment protection in everyday life, environmental innovations and alternatives.

References

External links
  

1996 establishments in Germany
Bi-monthly magazines published in Germany
Environmental magazines
Environmentalism in Germany
German-language magazines
Magazines established in 1996
Magazines published in Hamburg
Political magazines published in Germany
Quarterly magazines published in Germany